Gina Mancuso (born May 31, 1991) is an American former volleyball player.

Playing career 
She played for University of Nebraska.
She participated at the 2015–16 Women's CEV Cup, with Dresdner SC.

Clubs

References

External links 

1991 births
Living people
American women's volleyball players
Sportspeople from Nebraska
People from Bellevue, Nebraska
Nebraska Cornhuskers women's volleyball players
American expatriate sportspeople in Germany
Expatriate volleyball players in Germany
American expatriate sportspeople in Indonesia
Expatriate volleyball players in Indonesia
American expatriate sportspeople in Poland
Expatriate volleyball players in Poland
American expatriate sportspeople in Azerbaijan
Expatriate volleyball players in Azerbaijan